The 125th IOC Session took place at the Buenos Aires Hilton in Buenos Aires, Argentina, from 7 to 10 September 2013. On 7 September, the International Olympic Committee (IOC) elected Tokyo as the host city of the 2020 Summer Olympic Games. Wrestling was restored to the Olympic sports program for 2020 and 2024. Thomas Bach was elected to an eight-year term as IOC President on 10 September.

Session host city selection

The IOC received bids from two cities to host the 125th Session: the Argentine capital Buenos Aires and the Malaysian capital Kuala Lumpur made bids. Buenos Aires was elected at the 122nd IOC Session in Vancouver which took place prior to the 2010 Winter Olympics.

2020 Olympic host city election

The members of the IOC elected the host city of the 2020 Olympic Games on 7 September 2013. The candidates were Tokyo, Istanbul, and Madrid. Prior to the vote, the contest was considered to be close between the three cities. Tokyo was awarded the 2020 Summer Olympics. The results of the exhaustive ballot were as follows:

Following Madrid's elimination after a tie-breaking vote with Istanbul, the three Spanish IOC members were eligible to take part in the final round of voting.

Reaction
The announcement was met with jubilation from the Tokyo delegation and across Japan. Japanese prime minister Shinzō Abe, who had given a personal address during the presentation stage, said "I would like to thank everyone in the Olympic movement and we will host a wonderful Olympic Games." Japanese fencer Yuki Ota alluded to the 2011 earthquake in a statement to reporters, "After the earthquake everyone in Japan was depressed but now we have to make a dream come true."

Abe's role in the final stages of the bid, including his reassurances to the IOC that Fukushima radiation would not affect Tokyo, was considered to be a major asset. Tokyo's bid had also received support from Princess Hisako and Sheikh Ahmad Al-Fahad Al-Sabah. Madrid's bid was considered to have been hampered by Spain's weak economy and Istanbul's was considered to have been damaged by recent internal political instability and doping scandals, as well as match fixing in 2011.

IOC presidential election

On 10 September 2013, Thomas Bach of Germany was elected to succeed Jacques Rogge as IOC President, winning in two rounds of voting, over five other candidates.  The results of the vote were as follows:

Election of new IOC members

Nine individuals were elected IOC members at the 125th IOC Session on 10 September:

  Bernard Rajzman
  Dagmawit Girmay Berhane
  Paul Tergat
  Camiel Eurlings
  Mikee Cojuangco-Jaworski
  Octavian Morariu
  Alexander Zhukov
  Stefan Holm
  Larry Probst

Olympic gold order
King Willem-Alexander of the Netherlands was awarded this highest IOC honor on Sunday 8 September after he relinquished his membership to focus on matters at home.

Potential new sports
The IOC considered wrestling, squash and baseball/softball to the program for the 2020 Summer Olympics. Wrestling had been part of the Ancient Olympic Games and every Modern Olympic Games with the exception of the 1900 Paris Games, however in February 2013 it was dropped from the 2020 Olympic Program. Wrestling successfully campaigned at the 125th Session to be re-included in the 2020 program. The results of the vote on 8 September 2013 were:

Baseball/softball
Baseball was first included as a demonstration sport at the 1904 Summer Olympics in St. Louis. It was again played as a demonstration sport at the Summer Olympics in 1912, 1936, 1956, 1964, 1984, and 1988. It was first included as an official medal sport at the 1992 Summer Olympics in Barcelona. Baseball then featured at every Summer Olympic Games until the 2008 Olympics in Beijing, where it made its last Olympic appearance.

Softball was included at the Summer Olympics in 1996, 2000, 2004, and 2008.

The governing bodies for baseball (International Baseball Federation) and softball (International Softball Federation) merged in 2013 to form the World Baseball Softball Confederation. The two sports each had a separate bid for joining the Olympic program. Although Baseball and Softball were not successful in being included in the 2020 Olympic core program, in 2016 the Tokyo Olympic Organizing Committee and the WBSC successfully campaigned to have the two sports included in the 2020 Games as a one sport, two discipline event for a one-off appearance.

Squash
Squash is played in more than 185 countries and by millions of people worldwide. It has been played at various international sporting events, including the Pan American Games since 1995, and the All-Africa Games since 2003. Squash has also been played at both the Commonwealth Games and the Asian Games since 1998.

The sport is governed by the World Squash Federation.

Wrestling
Wrestling is practiced all around the world, officially in 177 countries, some of which participate in the Olympic Games in this sport alone. It was first introduced in the ancient Olympic Games in 708 BC and was included in all the ancient Olympics from that date. Wrestling has featured at the modern Summer Games since the 1896 Olympics in Athens, and it has been a part of all modern Olympics except those in Paris in 1900. It was still included in the Olympic program at the 2016 Summer Olympics in Rio de Janeiro. Wrestling was initially dropped from the 2020 Olympic program; however, it was given the opportunity to be reselected for the 2020 and 2024 Games.

The sport is governed by United World Wrestling.

See also

List of IOC meetings
121st IOC Session
123rd IOC Session
127th IOC Session
2018 Summer Youth Olympics

References

External links
Official Website for 125th IOC Session

International Olympic Committee sessions
2020 Summer Olympics bids
IOC
2013 conferences
IOC
Events in Buenos Aires
IOC Presidential elections